Alberto Giacchetto (born 21 February 1973 in Padua) is a former Italian pole vaulter.

He won one medal at senior level at the International athletics competitions. He received a doping ban in 1993 after testing positive for metandienone and stated that he would leave athletics regardless, as he was disgusted with it.

In his early twenties, he returned after disqualification to jump a personal best of 5.65 m in 1998. Abandoned his career as an athlete, he dedicated himself to masters athletics.

Achievements

See also
 Italian all-time lists - Pole vault
 Italy at the 1993 Summer Universiade

References

External links
 

1973 births
Living people
Italian male pole vaulters
Athletics competitors of Fiamme Gialle
Italian sportspeople in doping cases
Doping cases in athletics
Universiade medalists in athletics (track and field)
Universiade silver medalists for Italy
Medalists at the 1993 Summer Universiade